is a Shingon-sect Buddhist temple in the Kokubu neighborhood of the city of Miyazu, Kyoto, Japan. It is one of the few surviving provincial temples established by Emperor Shōmu during the Nara period (710–794). Due to this connection, the foundation stones of the Nara period temple now located to the south of the present day complex were designated as a National Historic Site in 1916.

History
These temples were built to a semi-standardized template, and served both to spread Buddhist orthodoxy to the provinces, and to emphasize the power of the Nara period centralized government under the Ritsuryō system.

The Tango Kokubun-ji is located is located on an alluvial fan that gently descends south from Mt. Nariai, southeast of the Tango Peninsula. The exact date of the temple's foundation is unknown; but is believed that work started around 741 AD as it is mentioned in historical records from 756 in a list of 26 kokubun-ji in various provinces, and roof tiles from this period have also been found on the site. The temple's name appears repeatedly in Heian period records, including the Engishiki of 927 AD. During the Kamakura period, the temple apparently suffered from a calamity during which its gold and bronze main image, a statue of Yakushi Nyōrai was stolen. The temple was reconstructed, and its new pagoda appears in Sesshū Tōyō's early Muromachi period painting of Ama-no-Hashidate. It was destroyed again in 1507 during the invasion of Tango Province by the Takeda clan of Wakasa Province, and once again in  1542. In the early Edo period, the temple was swept away by a flood in 1683, after which it was rebuilt on a much smaller scale on the hill to the north, where it is now located.

The site of the original temple has been known since antiquity. The  Kondō and Middle Gate were aligned north to south, with a Pagoda on the west. Currently, the foundation stones for the Kondō remain in situ, indicating a structure that is five by six bays in size. This corresponds to the building as depicted in the Kamakura period "Tango Kokubunji Revival Engi". Only two cornerstones for the Middle Gate survive, and the building is not depicted in the "Tango Kokubunji Revival Engi"; however, it is shown in the painting by Sesshū. Likewise, the Pagoda is not depicted in the Kamakura period "Tango Kokubunji Revival Engi", but is shown by Sesshū as a five-story structure. Currently, sixteen foundation stones remain in situ. It is believed that all of these foundation stones are not the Nara period original foundations, but date from the 1334 reconstruction.

Currently, the area around the ruins of Kokubunji has been maintained as a park and is open to the public. The temple site is a five minute walk from the  "Tango Museum Mae" bus stoops the Tango Kairiku Bus from Iwatakiguchi Station.

Cultural Properties

National Important Cultural Properties
, Nanboku-chō period, document recording the history of the reconstruction of Tango Kokubun-ji from 1328 to 1334. It is one of the few historical materials that reveals the circumstances of the construction of local temples in the Middle Ages, and the only historical material that concretely shows the reconstruction activities of kokubunji in the western part of Japan from the late Kamakura period to the Nanboku-chō period. The document was designated as a Kyoto Prefecture Tangible Cultural Property in 1990 and re-designated as a national Important Cultural Property in 1992.

Gallery

See also
List of Historic Sites of Japan (Kyoto)
provincial temple

References

External links

Miyazu city home page

Buddhist temples in Kyoto Prefecture
Historic Sites of Japan
Miyazu, Kyoto
Tango Province
Important Cultural Properties of Japan
8th-century establishments in Japan
Nara period
8th-century Buddhist temples
Kōyasan Shingon temples
Buddhist archaeological sites in Japan